Petrola may refer to

Pétrola, a municipality in Albacete, Spain
Petrola (oil) a Greek oil corporation, and the various ships it operated

, later renamed